Blue Origin NS-20 was a sub-orbital spaceflight mission operated by Blue Origin, which launched on 31 March 2022 using the New Shepard rocket. With six people on board, it was Blue Origin's fourth crewed flight, and twentieth flight overall to reach space.

The flight was originally scheduled to launch on 23 March, but was later postponed to 29 March, and then again to 31 March. American comedian Pete Davidson was expected to fly on board, but was unable to due to the launch date change. It was later announced that Blue Origin employee Gary Lai, chief architect of Blue Origin's New Shepard vehicle, would replace Davidson. Apart from Lai, the five other participants of the flight were paying passengers.

Crew 
The NS-20 crew was nicknamed the "Roaring Twenties".

References 

Space tourism
2022 in spaceflight
Test spaceflights
Aviation history of the United States
Suborbital human spaceflights
2022 in Texas
2022 in aviation
March 2022 events in the United States
New Shepard missions